Szekszárdi Utánpótlásnevelő Football Club is a professional football club based in Szekszárd, Tolna county, Hungary, that competes in the Nemzeti Bajnokság III, the third tier of Hungarian football.

Name changes
1993–1994: Szekszárdi Polgári SE
1994–1998: Utánpótlás FC Szekszárd
1998–1999: Jerking Szekszárd UFC
1999–2009: Szekszárdi Utánpótlásnevelő Football Club
2009–present: Tolle Utánpótlásnevelő Football Club Szekszárd

External links
 Profile on Magyar Futball

References

Football clubs in Hungary
Association football clubs established in 1992
1992 establishments in Hungary